Sigurd Agersnap Gustavson (born 2 March 1993) is a Danish politician and member of the Folketing, the national legislature. A member of the Green Left party, he has represented Greater Copenhagen since November 2022.

Agersnap was born on 2 March 1993 in Copenhagen. He is son of biologist Kim Gustavson and ethnogeographer Hanne Agersnap, a Member of the Folketing for Greater Copenhagen (2007-2011). He was educated at Fuglsanggårdsskolen and Virum Gymnasium in Virum. He has a Master of Science degree in political science from the University of Copenhagen (2020). He was a student assistant for the Danish Confederation of Trade Unions (LO) (2016-2018) and an intern at Oxfam IBIS (2019-2020). He was a consultant for the Danish Broadcasting Corporation from 2020-2022. He was on the board of wastewater utility Biofos from 2018 to 2022. He was a member of the municipal council in Lyngby-Taarbæk Municipality from 2018 to 2022 and was first deputy mayor from 2021 in a Conservative People's Party led administration.

References

External links

1993 births
Danish municipal councillors
Living people
Members of the Folketing 2022–2026
People from Kongens Lyngby
Socialist People's Party (Denmark) politicians
University of Copenhagen alumni